Murder Mystery is a 2019 American comedy mystery film directed by Kyle Newacheck and written by James Vanderbilt. The film stars Adam Sandler, Jennifer Aniston, and Luke Evans, and follows a married couple who are caught up in a murder investigation on a billionaire's yacht. It was released on June 14, 2019, by Netflix. It received mixed reviews from critics. A sequel is scheduled to be released by Netflix on March 31, 2023.

Plot 
Nick Spitz is a New York police officer, and his wife Audrey is a hairdresser. Audrey wants to visit Europe, as Nick had promised at their wedding, but thinks they never will. After their 15th-anniversary dinner, Audrey confronts Nick, who lies that he has in fact booked the trip, and they set off to Europe. On the plane, Audrey meets billionaire Charles Cavendish, who invites the couple to join him on his family yacht for a party celebrating his elderly uncle's upcoming wedding to Charles's former fiancée. After seeing how crowded and unpleasant-sounding their previously planned bus tour would be, Nick agrees.

Aboard the yacht, Nick and Audrey meet Cavendish's ex-fiancée Suzi Nakamura, his cousin and Quince's son Tobey, actress Grace Ballard, Colonel Ulenga, his bodyguard Sergei, Maharajah Vikram, race car driver Juan Carlos, and later that night their host, Malcolm Quince, Cavendish's uncle arrives. Quince announces that his new wife Suzi will be the only one to receive his inheritance, believing the others only feign interest in him because of his money. Before he can sign his new will, the lights go out and come back on to reveal Quince dead, stabbed with a ceremonial dagger.

Nick, who has lied to Audrey about recently becoming an NYPD detective, orders the room locked, and the guests return to their rooms. Later that night, the guests find Tobey, dead from an apparent suicide. Upon arriving in Monte Carlo, the guests are questioned by Inspector de la Croix, who believes that Nick and Audrey, "the Americans", are guilty of the murders.

At the Monaco Grand Prix, Nick and Audrey question the guests. That night, Sergei summons them to his room, where he reveals Quince had married the Colonel's fiancée while the Colonel was in a coma after saving Quince's life, which ended with her death and a child who was allegedly stillborn. The couple hide when someone knocks on the door, and come out to find Sergei has been shot. Bravely, they climb out the window and edge along the ledge, high above the ground. In the process, they see the Colonel flossing his teeth vigorously and Maharajah and Grace kissing in his room, ruling out the chances of any of them being the murderer and killing Sergei. While fleeing, they see on the news that de la Croix has issued a warrant for their arrest. Audrey is furious to learn from the broadcast Nick is not actually a detective and from his confession that he lied about booking the trip in advance, and she leaves with Cavendish.

All of them move to Lake of Como, where Uncle Quince had a luxury villa: there Nick finds Suzi moving suspiciously on the street.
Nick follows Suzi to a library where he finds Audrey, who reveals Cavendish is in the building as well. They realize Cavendish and Suzi are still in love and, presumably are the murderers planning to split the inheritance. The couple are forced to flee from a hidden gunman and run into Carlos. They soon are confronted by Suzi, who is killed by a masked person with a blow dart. Nick and Carlos try to chase the killer but fail. Nick and Audrey go to Quince's mansion to confront Cavendish, but find him dead by poisoning.

The couple summons de la Croix and the remaining guests, the Colonel, Grace, Maharajah, and Carlos, who all have alibis. Nick and Audrey deduce that Grace is the murderer; she convinced Tobey to kill his father, before killing him and has been picking off the other heirs. Grace reveals that she is Quince's child that "died" and that his money truly belongs to her, though she denies being the killer. However, Audrey proves her guilt (she was hiding a cut Nick gave her as the masked killer under a conspicuous hat) and is shot by Nick in her attempt to escape.

While celebrating, Nick and Audrey learn that Grace's alibi still stands and there must be another conspirator who could've killed Sergei. They realize Carlos is the second murderer, who blamed Quince for an accident his father had where he had lost both of his legs. Carlos holds de la Croix hostage and leads Nick and Audrey in a car chase, but they force his car to crash and rescue de la Croix. Carlos holds them all at gunpoint, but is killed by the chaotic tour bus, which Nick and Audrey would have initially boarded at the start of their trip.

De la Croix thanks the couple and offers to help get Nick promoted to detective back home. The movie ends with Nick and Audrey continuing their vacation aboard the fabled Orient Express courtesy of Interpol.

Cast

Production 
In June 2012, it was reported that Charlize Theron had signed on to star in Murder Mystery, a mystery-comedy then set to be directed by John Madden, from James Vanderbilt's screenplay. Before the announcement, the project had been set up at Walt Disney Studios with Kevin McDonald set to direct. In April 2013, it was reported that Colin Firth, Adam Sandler and Emily Blunt had joined the cast - although, representatives for Firth and Blunt denied that they were boarding the film. In September 2013, it was reported that both Theron and Madden had left the project and that Anne Fletcher was now set to direct for TWC-Dimension; Theron eventually received an executive producer credit on the film, along with her studio, Denver and Delilah Productions, listed in the film.

In March 2018, it was announced that Sandler and Jennifer Aniston had signed to star, reuniting them after Just Go with It,  their 2011 film. Kyle Newacheck directed, still with Vanderbilt's script, and the film premiered on Netflix as part of Sandler's distribution deal. In June 2018, it was announced that Luke Evans, Gemma Arterton, David Walliams, Erik Griffin, John Kani, Shioli Kutsuna, Luis Gerardo Méndez, Adeel Akhtar, Ólafur Darri Ólafsson, Dany Boon and Terence Stamp had joined the cast.

Principal photography on the film began on June 14, 2018 in Montréal. In late July 2018, filming began in Italy at locations including Santa Margherita Ligure, Lake Como, and Milan (where most of the scenes set in Monaco were actually shot) also using vehicles and uniforms of the Carabinieri.

Release 
The film was digitally released worldwide on June 14, 2019.

On June 18, 2019, Netflix reported that 30.9 million households watched the film in the first 72 hours, the biggest opening weekend for a film in the company's history. In July 2019, Netflix reported that the film was viewed by 73 million households in its first four weeks of release, based on a viewing metric of at least 70% of the film watched, making it Sandler's most successful film on the streaming platform. Viewership numbers were adjusted up to 83 million accounts worldwide based on Netflix's new metric of at least 2 minutes of the film watched, making it the fifth most-watched original film on Netflix. Updated hourly figures state the movie was watched for 169.59 million hours in the first 28 days of release.

Reception

Critical response 
The site's critical consensus reads, "Murder Mystery reunites Jennifer Aniston and Adam Sandler for a lightweight comedy that's content to settle for merely mediocre." Metacritic assigned the film a weighted average score of 38 out of 100, based on 19 critics, indicating "generally unfavorable reviews."

Amy Nicholson of Variety wrote: "Murder Mystery feels as shamelessly gaudy as paste jewelry — a trinket for nights that aspire to nothing more exotic than a pizza — but Aniston sparkles like the real deal."
John DeFore  of The Hollywood Reporter called it "A tale as generic, and as dull, as its title."

Accolades

Sequel

In October 2019, it was announced that a sequel is in development with Sandler and Aniston reprising their roles. In August 2021, Jeremy Garelick was hired as director and to rewrite the script, with filming of the sequel to take place in Paris and in the Caribbean.

References

External links
 
 
Murder Mystery at Rotten Tomatoes

2019 films
2019 comedy films
2010s comedy mystery films
American comedy mystery films
American detective films
English-language Netflix original films
Films produced by Adam Sandler
Films produced by James Vanderbilt
Films scored by Rupert Gregson-Williams
Films set in Málaga
Films set in Monaco
Films set in New York City
Films shot in Milan
Films shot in Montreal
Films with screenplays by James Vanderbilt
Happy Madison Productions films
Films about vacationing
Murder mystery films
2010s English-language films
2010s American films